Mark Paoletta is an American attorney who served as general counsel to the Office of Management and Budget from January 8, 2018, to January 20, 2021. Prior to his post, Paoletta served as chief counsel and assistant to Vice President Mike Pence from January 20, 2017, to January 5, 2018. 

Paoletta specializes in representing clients in congressional investigations. He represents Ginni Thomas, a conservative activist and spouse of U.S. Supreme Court Justice Clarence Thomas, in her interactions with the United States House Select Committee on the January 6 Attack. Paoletta is a close friend of both Thomases, and participated in Justice Thomas's confirmation to the Supreme Court

Paoletta received a bachelor's degree from Duquesne University and his J.D. from Georgetown University Law Center.

Career
Paoletta began his career as Chief Counsel for Oversight and Investigations for the House Energy and Commerce Committee from September 1997 until January 2007.

During his tenure as Chief Counsel for Oversight and Investigations, Paoletta managed nearly 200 investigative hearings. In a report released in February 2007, Congressman Joe Barton (R-Texas), Ranking Member of the House Energy and Commerce Committee, released a compilation of the Oversight and Investigations Subcommittee's work from 2001 through 2006 that served "as a road map through many of the great government and corporate scandals of this decade."

In 2007, Paoletta became partner at the Washington, D.C. law firm DLA Piper and partner in the firm's Federal Law and Policy practice. He has represented numerous companies and individuals, including a major hedge funds and foreign and domestic banks, according to Bisnow Media. Paoletta has represented Scott Jennings, a former Special Assistant to President George W. Bush, in connection with the various investigations into the firings of U.S. Attorneys. In 2007, Paoletta appeared before the Senate Judiciary Committee as counsel for Scott Jennings, who had been directed by President Bush to not answer certain questions based on an assertion of executive privilege. In a letter to Chairman Leahy and Senator Specter, White House Counsel Fred F. Fielding indicated that President George W. Bush would assert executive privilege regarding Jennings' testimony. The letter indicates that Jennings was made aware of the President's decision and was directed not to provide any testimony covered by the assertion.

In November 2007, Paoletta was selected to serve as outside counsel to the U.S. House of Representatives Select Committee to Investigate Voting Irregularities of August 2, 2007.

Paoletta served as Assistant Counsel to the President during the George H. W. Bush administration, where he played a key role in the successful confirmation effort of U.S. Supreme Court Justice Clarence Thomas.
 Paoletta subsequently created a website to promote Thomas's autobiography, My Grandfather's Son, as well as positive stories by others about Thomas.

Paoletta's work representing strength trainer Brian McNamee in the 2008 United States Congressional hearing on Roger Clemens was highlighted in the book, American Icon: The Fall of Roger Clemens and the Rise of Steroids in America's Pastime by Teri Thompson, Nathaniel Vinton, Michael O'Keeffe, and Christian Red.

Paoletta's work in the Enron investigation was highlighted in the book Conspiracy of Fools: A True Story, by Kurt Eichenwald. Paoletta wrote about his work on the Committee in a February 5, 2007 article in Roll Call. Paoletta also co-authored a piece entitled "Storm Clouds on the Horizon – Congressional Investigations 101."

On January 5, 2017, Paoletta along with then Vice President-elect Mike Pence, Reince Priebus, Steve Bannon, and Don McGahn helped Donald Trump vet Judge Neil Gorsuch to fill the vacant seat on the Supreme Court.

On January 25, 2017, Paoletta was named as chief counsel and assistant to the Vice President. In January 2018, Paoletta left the Vice President's office to become the General Counsel for the Office of Management and Budget.

External links

 George H. W. Bush Library files on Clarence Thomas nomination, with extensive material contributed by Paoletta

References

Living people
Duquesne University alumni
Georgetown University Law Center alumni
American political consultants
Trump administration personnel
Year of birth missing (living people)